Pen yr Allt Uchaf is a subsidiary summit of Aran Fawddwy in the south of the Snowdonia National Park in Gwynedd, Wales. The summit is the highest point on a ridge branching off to the west of Aran Fawddwy's south ridge.

The summit is marked by a small cairn, and offers bird-eyes views of Cwm Cywarch. Close views of the steep south faces of Glasgwm, Gwaun y Llwyni and Aran Fawddwy are observed.

References

External links
 www.geograph.co.uk : photos of Aran Fawddwy and surrounding area

Mawddwy
Mountains and hills of Gwynedd
Mountains and hills of Snowdonia
Hewitts of Wales
Nuttalls